Kathari is a village in Barmer District in the  Indian state of Rajasthan.

Historically, the village was in the Malani Kingdom and ruled by the independent Mahecha clan of Rathore Rajputs and Sisodiya Rajput.

External links
 Kathari, Onefivenine

Villages in Barmer district